Aarum is a Norwegian surname. Notable people with the surname include:

Anders Aarum (born 1974), Norwegian jazz pianist
Marit Aarum (1903–1956), Norwegian economist, liberal politician, civil servant, and feminist

Norwegian-language surnames